Kunakbayevo (Qunaqbay) is a rural locality (a village) in Nikolayevsky Selsoviet, Sterlitamaksky District, Bashkortostan, Russia. The population was 105 as of 2010. There is one street.

Geography 
Kunakbayevo is located 23 km southwest of Sterlitamak (the district's administrative centre) by road. Preobrazhenovka is the nearest rural locality.

References 

Rural localities in Sterlitamaksky District